Xinfeng railway station is a third-class railway station in Xinfeng County, Ganzhou, Jiangxi, China. It is an intermediate stop on the Beijing–Kowloon railway.

History
The station opened in 1996.

Services
The station currently has around 13 trains daily, the number varies according to the day and the season. As of 2018, the station serves around 4000 passengers daily.

See also 

 Xinfeng West railway station

Notes

References 

Railway stations in Jiangxi
Railway stations in China opened in 1996